Cannock Chase is a constituency represented in the House of Commons of the UK Parliament since 2015 by Amanda Milling of the Conservative Party. She served as the Minister for Asia and the Middle East in the Foreign, Commonwealth and Development Office from 16 September 2021 to 7 September 2022.

Members of Parliament

Boundaries 

The constituency contains three towns, Cannock, Rugeley, and Hednesford, with several pit villages, and the Chase itself situated between Hednesford and Rugeley. Since 2010 the seat has broadly the same boundaries as did the 1974-1983 seat of Cannock.

Prior to 1997, Cannock and Hednesford were part of the Cannock and Burntwood constituency, while Rugeley was part of the Mid Staffordshire constituency. Between 1997 and 2010 the village of Huntington was part of the constituency though it was part of South Staffordshire local government district.

2010–present: The District of Cannock Chase.

1997–2010: The District of Cannock Chase, and the District of South Staffordshire ward of Huntington.

History
The seat was created for the 1997 election; the Labour Party held the seat for 13 years, until Aidan Burley of the Conservative Party was elected at the 2010 general election with a large 14% swing, the second largest Labour to Conservative swing at that election. Amanda Milling has subsequently held the seat, increasing the Conservative majority in both 2015 and 2017. In 2019, the Conservative majority increased to nearly 20,000 votes.

Elections

Elections in the 2010s

The vote share change in 2010 comes from the notional, not actual, 2005 results because of the boundary change (loss of Huntington).

Elections in the 2000s

Elections in the 1990s

See also
List of parliamentary constituencies in Staffordshire

Notes

References

External links 
nomis Constituency Profile for Cannock Chase — presenting data from the ONS annual population survey and other official statistics.

Parliamentary constituencies in Staffordshire
Cannock Chase District
South Staffordshire District
Constituencies of the Parliament of the United Kingdom established in 1997